Pratum is an unincorporated community in Marion County, Oregon, United States. It is located northeast of Salem on Howell Prairie near the Pudding River. Pratum is Latin for "meadow". The community was settled in the late 19th century by a group of Mennonites, many of them of Swiss extraction. A branch of the narrow-gauge Oregonian Railway was built through the area in about 1880, and the station there was called "East Side Junction". The railway was eventually converted to standard gauge, and is still in use today by the Willamette Valley Railway. In 1895, the station was renamed "Enger" by a Mr. Larson, who opened the first store there. "Enger" was confused with Eugene, however, and the name of the station changed to "Pratum" in 1898. Pratum post office was established in 1887, and was originally called "Switzerland", then "Enger" and finally "Pratum" in 1898, matching the railroad station. The post office ran until 1964. Pratum School, built in 1928 and part of the Silver Falls School District, is still operating.

The community is part of the Salem Metropolitan Statistical Area.

References

External links

Pratum Elementary School
Historic images of Pratum from Salem Public Library

Salem, Oregon metropolitan area
Unincorporated communities in Marion County, Oregon
1887 establishments in Oregon
Populated places established in 1887
Unincorporated communities in Oregon